The Embassy of France in London is the diplomatic mission of France to the United Kingdom. Located just off Knightsbridge at Albert Gate, one of the entrances to Hyde Park, it is situated immediately opposite the Embassy of Kuwait.

This building, along with the rest of Albert Gate and neighbouring buildings, were designed by the British architect Thomas Cubitt; his son, George Cubitt, who was created Baron Ashcombe in 1892, is Camilla, Queen Consort's great-great-grandfather.

At the time of these buildings' construction in the 1840s, they were by far the tallest structures in the neighbourhood.

France also owns various premises along the Cromwell Road, South Kensington which house its Consular, Cultural, Science & Technology and Visa sections. It also has a Trade Mission at 28-29 Haymarket and a Paymaster & Financial Comptroller Section at 30 Queen’s Gate Terrace, South Kensington, while No. 11 Kensington Palace Gardens has been the French Ambassador's official residence since 1944.

Gallery

See also 
List of Ambassadors of France to the United Kingdom
Embassy of the United Kingdom, Paris

References

External links
Official site

France
London
France–United Kingdom relations
Buildings and structures in the Royal Borough of Kensington and Chelsea
Buildings and structures in the City of Westminster
Knightsbridge